Hassan Odeola (born 3 February 1988) is a Nigerian footballer who last played as a defender for ONGC F.C. in the I-League.

Career statistics

Club
Statistics accurate as of 11 May 2013

References

Living people
Nigerian footballers
I-League players
ONGC FC players
1988 births
Association football defenders